Xing Ailan (born 23 February 1965) is a Chinese athlete. She competed in the women's discus throw at the 1988 Summer Olympics.

References

1965 births
Living people
Athletes (track and field) at the 1988 Summer Olympics
Chinese female discus throwers
Olympic athletes of China
Place of birth missing (living people)